The Pokfield Road Bus Terminus is a bus terminus located on Pok Fu Lam Road, Central and Western District, Hong Kong.

Location 
The terminus is located next to a slope on the side of Pok Fu Lam Road southbound carriageway near the intersection of Pokfield Road.

References
 Hong Kong Guidebook 1981, published by Universal Publications
 Public Transport Atlas 4th edition, published by Universal Publications
 The Development of Hong Kong Island Bus Routes in the 20th Century by Stanley Yung, published by BSI Hobbies 

Pok Fu Lam